In Mandaeism, Hag and Mag are a pair of demons that are usually mentioned together. Hag is a male demon, while Mag is a female demon. Hibil Ziwa encounters Hag and Mag during his descent to the World of Darkness in Chapter 1 of Book 5 in the Right Ginza, where they are described as "the two manas of darkness." Hag is represented by the image of a scorpion on the skandola talisman.

See also
Adathan and Yadathan, a pair of uthras in the World of Light

References

Demons in Mandaeism
Mythological duos
Mythological married couples